An almanac is an annual publication listing a set of current information.

Almanac may also refer to:

Literature
 Almanac (Pennsylvania), a weekly newspaper in Washington County, Pennsylvania
 The Almanac (Menlo Park), a weekly California newspaper
 Nautical almanac, a publication describing the positions of a selection of celestial bodies

Music and theatre
 Almanac (band), a 1970s free jazz ensemble
 Almanac, a metal band formed in 2015 by Victor Smolski
 Almanac (They Might Be Giants album), 2002
 Almanac, an album by the Nadas, 2010
 The Almanac, an EP by Nine Mile, 2006
 John Murray Anderson's Almanac, a 1953 Broadway musical revue

Television
 Almanac (American TV series), a public-affairs program produced by Twin Cities Public Television
 Almanac (Canadian TV series), a 1961 documentary series

Other uses
 ALMANAC (Axillary Lymphatic Mapping Against Nodal Axillary Clearance), a UK breast cancer trial
 Almanac Beer Company, an American brewery
 GPS Almanac, a digital schedule of satellite orbital parameters for GPS receivers

See also
 List of almanacs
 
 Almanach (album), a 1976 album by Malicorne